The 2012 Arab Cup U-20 is the second edition of the Arab Cup U-20. The tournament will be hosted by Jordan between July 4 and July 18, 2012.

The draw for the tournament took place on April 11, 2012, in Amman, Jordan.

Participants

Venues

Group stage

Group A

Group B

Group C

Best placed runner-up
The team that finish highest of all group runners-up will also proceed to the semi-final stage.

Knockout stage

Semi finals

Third place play-off

Final

Winners

Award winners
Fair play Award: 
Best player:  Ahmed Mohamed Bashir
Top goal scorer (Golden Boot):   Seifeddine Jaziri (6 goals)
Best goalkeeper:  Mouadh Mansouri

References

Arab
2012–13 in Jordanian football
International association football competitions hosted by Jordan
Arab Cup U-20
Arab
2012 in youth association football